The Eswatini Football Association (EFA), formerly known as the National Football Association of Swaziland (NFAS), is the governing body of football in Eswatini. It was founded in 1968, and affiliated to FIFA in 1978 and to CAF in 1976. It organizes the national football league and the national team.

The EFA adopted its current name on 1 July 2018, during the ordinary general assembly of the national football association at the Sibane Hotel. On 11 September, the EFA announced that it will hold an event to unveil its new branding, including a new logo.

References

External links 
 Official site
 Eswatini at the FIFA website.
 Eswatini at CAF Online

Eswatini
Football in Eswatini
Sports governing bodies in Eswatini
Sports organizations established in 1968